Verona is an unincorporated community in Clay County, Nebraska, United States.

History
Verona was named in 1884 for the Veronica family of pioneer settlers. A post office was established in Verona in 1887, and remained in operation until it was discontinued in 1954.

References

Populated places in Clay County, Nebraska
Unincorporated communities in Nebraska